David Gray Mason (August 30, 1942 – April 3, 2022) was an American politician.

Mason was born in New Castle, Kentucky. He lived in Shelbyville, Kentucky, and went to the University of Kentucky College of Law. He was elected to the Kentucky House of Representatives in 1973, and served until November 1977, when he resigned to become county attorney for Henry County.

References

1942 births
2022 deaths
People from New Castle, Kentucky
People from Shelbyville, Kentucky
University of Kentucky College of Law alumni
Members of the Kentucky House of Representatives
20th-century American politicians